Rogin is a surname. Notable people with the surname include:

Josh Rogin, American journalist
Leo Rogin (1893–1947), American economist and economic historian
Michael Rogin (1937–2001), American political scientist

See also
Fred Roggin (born 1957), American sports anchorman
Rogan, surname
Rogen § People with the name